Phoolchand Gupta (born 30 October 1958) is an Indian Hindi and Gujarati language poet, writer and translator. He hails from Himmatnagar, Gujarat, India. He made significant contributions to the Gujarati Dalit literature. Hindi Sahitya Akademi of state awarded him in 2013 for his book Khwabkhwahon Ki Sadi Hai. He won the Shafdar Hashmi Prize (2000) for his book Isi Mahol Mein.

Early life 
Phoolchand Gupta was born to his parents, Jagatnarayan and Savitridevi, on 30 October 1958 at Amraigaon, a village in Rudauli city of Ayodhya district in the Indian state of Uttar Pradesh. He completed his primary education from Amraigaon Primary School in 1969. In 1970, he came to Ahmedabad and completed his schooling (Old S.S.C.) from Janta Hindi High School, Naroda in 1974. He got his Bachelor of Commerce in 1978 from Sardar Vallabhbhai Patel Commerce Mahavidyalay, Ahmedabad.

In 1982, he joined H. K. Arts College, Ahmedabad and got his Bachelor of Arts in 1985 in English literature. He did his Master of Arts in 1987 from School of Languages of Gujarat University. In the same year, he did Postgraduate diploma in Journalism from Bhavan's Center, Ahmedabad. Again in 1993, he obtained Master of Arts in Hindi literature from Gujarat University. Under the guidance of Uttambhai Patel, he received a Ph.D. for his dissertation Ikkisvi Sadi Ke Pratham Dashak Ke Hindi Upanyas Me Dalit, Nari Evam Vargiya Chetna in 2013 from Veer Narmad South Gujarat University.

Career 
Gupta started his career in 1980 as a clerk at a private transport company at Ahmedabad. From 1987 to 1988, he served as a journalist at Young India, a daily. In 1989, he joined Sabargram Vidyapith, Sonasan in Prantij as a professor of English literature.

He started writing poems during his school days. His first poem was published in 1973. Subsequently, his writings were published in Gujarati and Hindi literary magazines including Hansa, Samkaleen Bharatiya Sahitya, English Literature, Nirikshak, Navneet Samarpan and Kumar. He started writing in Gujarati after moving to Prantij.

Works 
He has written poems, short stories and essays in Hindi and Gujarati. He is known as revolutionary poet in Hindi literature.

Isi Mahol Me, his first collection of poems in Hindi, was published in 1997, followed by Hey Ram (2002). Saansat Me Hai Kabootar (2003), Koi Nahi Sunata Aag Ke Sansmaran (2006), Rakh Ka Dher (2010), Kot Ki Jaib Se Jhankati Prithvi (2012), Dinu Aur Kauvve (2012), Jharne Ki Tarah (2013), 
Phool Aur Titli (2014) and Timir ka Durg (2021) are his collections of poetry.

Khwabkhwaho Ki Sadi Hai (2009) and Aarzoo-E-Phoolchand (2015) are his collections of Gazals. Prayaschit Nahi Pratishodh is his story collection. Pratham Dashak ke Hindi Upanyas Aur Mukti Chetna (2016) is a collection of literary criticism. 

Gandhi Aantarman (2008, Gujarati), Mahagatha (2011) and GEMS on Grass Tips (2018, poems in prose) are his other literary collections.

Gupta has translated several literary works including Gujarati language stories, poems, interviews, plays and critical essays. He translated Raghuvir Chaudhary's Gujarati novels: Lagani, Ichhawar Uparwas, Sahvas and Antarvas into Hindi. He also translated Harish Mangalam's Gujarati story collection Talab.

Recognition 
Gupta's contributions to the field of Hindi literature have been recognised and he has received many literary awards. He won Shafdar Hashmi Puraskar in 2000 for his book Isi Mahol Me (1997). Gujarat Sahitya Akademi awarded him Gujarat Hindi Sahitya Akademi Award in 2014 for his book Phool Aur Titli. He has also received Aravali Shikhar Sanman and Antarrashtriya Tathagat Sanman.

Family 
He married Shakun Gupta in 1982 and they have a daughter, Pallavi, and two sons, Siddhartha and Ruchir. He lives in Himmatnagar.

See also

 List of Gujarati-language writers

References 

1958 births
Living people
Indian male poets
Gujarati-language writers
Poets from Gujarat
Gujarati-language poets
People from Sabarkantha district
People from Faizabad district
Hindi-language writers
Gujarat University alumni
20th-century Indian translators
20th-century Indian poets
20th-century Indian male writers